Klemen Klemen is a Slovenian rap music artist. He started rapping when he was 13, first in English. In 2000, he was signed by Nika Records, and released the rap album - Trnow Stajl.  In 2003, he released his second album called Hipnoza (Hypnosis). In 2015, he released his third album S3p.

References

1975 births
Slovenian rappers
Living people
Musicians from Ljubljana